John Mooney (born August 6, 1964) is an American sprint canoer who competed from the mid-1990s to the early 2000s (decade). He won a gold medal in the K-2 200 m event at the 1995 ICF Canoe Sprint World Championships in Duisburg.

Mooney also competed in two Summer Olympics, earning his best finish of sixth in the K-4 1000 m event at Sydney in 2000.

Mooney was born in Seattle, WA, and lives in Eugene, Oregon with his wife and two children.

References

1964 births
American male canoeists
Canoeists at the 1996 Summer Olympics
Canoeists at the 2000 Summer Olympics
Living people
Olympic canoeists of the United States
Sportspeople from Eugene, Oregon
Sportspeople from Seattle
ICF Canoe Sprint World Championships medalists in kayak